Seán Dunne (1956–1995) was a poet born in Waterford, Ireland.

Career 

Dunne edited several anthologies, beginning with The Poets of Munster (1985) and finishing with the Ireland Anthology which was completed posthumously by George O'Brien and Dunne's partner Trish Edelstein. He released 3 collections of poems. Dunne's collections of poems were all well received, and in order of release are: Against the Storm (1985), The Sheltered Nest (1992) and Time and the Island. The account of his childhood In My Father's House, published in 1991, was a bestseller.

Life 

Dunne's father was Richard Dunne. His mother died in 1960 when Dunne was four. Sean attended Scoil Lorcain primary school in St Johns Park and Mount Sion secondary school in Waterford city, where he wrote for the school magazine and participated in organising poetry and music evenings. He attended University College Cork (UCC) where he was taught by Sean Lucy and John Montague and was part of a stream of talent issuing from the university in that period, which included Maurice Riordan, Gregory O'Donoghue, Theo Dorgan, Thomas McCarthy, William Wall, Gerry Murphy, Greg Delanty and others. He became part of a group referred to as "the Cork poets", despite not being from Cork himself. He was active in student politics, as detailed in his memoir The Road to Silence.

After college Dunne settled in Cork where he worked in the city library and continued to write and publish poems. Around this time he began to make a living from freelance journalism. He joined the Cork Examiner daily newspaper as a columnist.

Dunne died on 3 August 1995 of a heart problem, aged 39.

He had three children. His son, Gavin Dunne, is a successful independent musician based in Cork.

Sean Dunne Writers Festival 
In 1996 Waterford City Council inaugurated the Sean Dunne Writers Festival in his honour. The 2009 Festival took place in Waterford City from Thursday 19 March to Saturday 21 March. It featured poets such as Tom Paulin, Conor O'Callaghan and MacDara Woods, with performance poets Eamon Carr and Raven.  It also featured writers A. L. Kennedy, Paul Carson, Declan Lynch and more. The winner of the competition was Luke Byrne from St John's Park, Waterford, for his poem "Winter".

References 

1956 births
1995 deaths
20th-century Irish poets
20th-century male writers